NANOG may refer to:

 North American Network Operators' Group
 Homeobox protein NANOG, a transcription factor